Qaleh Now-e Valiabad (also Romanized as Qal‘eh Now-e Valīābād; also known as Qal‘eh Now) is a village in Darzab Rural District, in the Central District of Mashhad County, Razavi Khorasan Province, Iran. At the 2006 census, its population was 609, in 154 families.

References 

Populated places in Mashhad County